The Metra Police Department was created to protect the eleven rail lines and 242 stations in metropolitan Chicago's commuter rail system, Metra. The primary function of the Metra Police Department is to protect Metra passengers, employees, assets (trains and stations), enforce criminal laws, traffic laws and ordinances that directly or indirectly relate to the Metra system. Metra police officers are fully sworn officers just like the officers of any municipal police department, responsible for the safety and security of the Metra system in a six-county service area – Cook, Will, DuPage, Kane, McHenry and Lake counties.

History

In 1974, the Illinois State Legislature created the Regional Transportation Authority (RTA). When the RTA reorganized in 1983, Metra was created. This act empowers all the sub units of the RTA to establish and maintain police forces. The Metra Police Department was created at that time.

Powers and authority
The RTA Act states that these police departments have the authority of municipal police officers. The main focus of department is the six-county transit operation, however due to the great distances between rail lines, off-property arrests occur on a regular basis. 

All Metra police officers are fully certified police officers. Because of the six counties of police operation, tickets and criminal complaints are booked into many different courts. As a general rule, court cases are assigned in the nearest court, in the county of arrest.

Safety 
Safety is an important part of this function, and preventing accidents and injuries are a focus of the department. Many times enforcing traffic laws around Metra stations and crossings is intended to increase awareness and citizen compliance. 

Metra Police work in cooperation with local authorities to reduce or attempt to prevent hazardous conditions or blatant violations of the law which result in an unsafe condition. Metra Police routinely assist local, county and state agencies in non Metra related matters. The jurisdiction of the Metra Police extends well past the property owned or leased by Metra. 

In 2008, the department began using a computer-aided dispatch system and new electronic report writing system.

2014 investigation report
In January 2014, an investigative report by the Chicago-based security consulting firm Hillard Heintze blasted the department as being "antiquated" and beset with excessive overtime and staffing problems. The 114-page report sketched an alarming portrait of law enforcement standards on the Metra system. It detailed myriad concerns about the agency's training, counter terrorism efforts and commitment to passenger safety. According to the report, the department averages less than one arrest per day.

New Chief
In May 2014, Joseph Perez was appointed Chief of the Metra Police Department. Perez was selected from a field of 12 candidates after 68 applied for the job.

Homeland Security Unit 
After the September 11 attacks in 2001, the Metra Police Department increased its effort in anti-terrorism concerns. The Homeland Security Unit (formally Special Operations Unit) concentrates on protecting passengers and Metra terminals throughout the system. Officers have been assigned to the Chicago Police Fusion Center (CPIC), and the Illinois State Police Statewide Terrorism Information Center (STIC). Metra Police officers regularly participate in the Chicago Police CAPS program. Metra Police regularly participate in Chicago Office of Emergency Communications (OEMC) planning meetings for large events.

Fallen officer 
One Metra officer has died in the line of duty. On September 27, 2006, Metra Officer Thomas A. Cook was killed in the line of duty while working a robbery prevention detail near the  station in Harvey, Illinois. 

He was slain in his patrol car by a suspect with a firearm. The offender was sentenced to life in prison on March 31, 2016, for Officer Cook's murder. Officer Cook was 43.

See also
Metra
Regional Transportation Authority
Railroad police

References

External links
 Official website

Metra
Government agencies established in 1983
Transit police departments of the United States